Galeosoma is a genus of African armored trapdoor spiders that was first described by William Frederick Purcell in 1903.

Species
 it contains twelve species and three subspecies:
Galeosoma coronatum Hewitt, 1915 – South Africa
Galeosoma c. sphaeroideum Hewitt, 1919 – South Africa
Galeosoma crinitum Hewitt, 1919 – South Africa
Galeosoma hirsutum Hewitt, 1916 – South Africa
Galeosoma mossambicum Hewitt, 1919 – Mozambique
Galeosoma pallidum Hewitt, 1915 – South Africa
Galeosoma p. pilosum Hewitt, 1916 – South Africa
Galeosoma planiscutatum Hewitt, 1919 – South Africa
Galeosoma pluripunctatum Hewitt, 1919 – South Africa
Galeosoma robertsi Hewitt, 1916 – South Africa
Galeosoma schreineri Hewitt, 1913 – South Africa
Galeosoma scutatum Purcell, 1903 (type) – South Africa
Galeosoma vandami Hewitt, 1915 – South Africa
Galeosoma v. circumjunctum Hewitt, 1919 – South Africa
Galeosoma vernayi Hewitt, 1935 – Botswana

See also
 List of Idiopidae species

References

External links

Arthropods of Botswana
Arthropods of South Africa
Idiopidae
Mygalomorphae genera
Spiders of Africa
Taxa named by William Frederick Purcell